Michael Yamaguchi is an American attorney who served as the United States Attorney for the Northern District of California from 1993 to 1998.

References

Living people
United States Attorneys for the Northern District of California
California Democrats
Year of birth missing (living people)